Leo Rabkin (1919, Cincinnati, New York — 2015, New York, New York) was an American artist and is in the collections of Museum of Modern Art and Smithsonian Institution.

References

1919 births
2015 deaths
20th-century American painters
21st-century American painters
People from Cincinnati